Nikola Jovanović (born August 5, 1969) is a Serbian former professional basketball player.

Playing career 
Jovanović played for the Borac Čačak, Crvena zvezda, Mornar Bar, FMP Železnik, Hemofarm and Beobanka of the Yugoslav League. In 1992–93 season, he won the Yugoslav League with Crvena zvezda and played together with Dragoljub Vidačić, Nebojša Ilić, Saša Obradović, Mileta Lisica, Predrag Stojaković, Rastko Cvetković, Aleksandar Trifunović and Dejan Tomašević. In his second season with the Zvezda he won his second national championship.

He also played for the Vastiau-Godeau Leuven of the Belgium Division I and the Yambol of the Bulgarian National League. During a sting with Yambol he played FIBA Europe Champions Cup in 2002–03 season. Over four tournament games, he averaged 13.1 points, 4.0 rebounds and 0.3 assists per game.

Career achievements
 Yugoslav League champion: 2 (with Crvena zvezda: 1992–93, 1993–94)
 Yugoslav Cup winner: 1 (with FMP Železnik: 1996–97)
 Yugoslav Super Cup winner: 1 (with Crvena zvezda: 1993)

References

External links
 Player Profile at eurobasket.com

1969 births
Living people
Basketball players from Čačak
BC Yambol players
Bulgarian people of Serbian descent
Bulgarian expatriate basketball people in Serbia
Centers (basketball)
KK Borac Čačak players
KK Crvena zvezda players
KK FMP (1991–2011) players
KK Hemofarm players
KK Mornar Bar players
KK Železničar Čačak players
Leuven Bears players
Power forwards (basketball)
Serbian men's basketball players
Serbian expatriate basketball people in Belgium
Serbian expatriate basketball people in Bulgaria
Serbian expatriate basketball people in Montenegro
Yugoslav men's basketball players